Buddhologist Edward Conze (1966) has proposed that similarities existed between Buddhism and Gnosticism, a term deriving from the name Gnostics, which was given to a number of Christian sects. To the extent that Buddha taught the existence of evil inclinations that remain unconquered, or that require special spiritual knowledge to conquer, Buddhism has also qualified as Gnostic.

Edward Conze 

Edward Conze claimed to have noted phenomenological commonalities between Mahayana Buddhism and Gnosticism, in his paper Buddhism and Gnosis, following an early suggestion by Isaac Jacob Schmidt. Conze explicitly compared Mahayana Buddhism with "gnosis," that is, knowledge or insight, and not with the Gnostics, because too little was known about the Gnostics as a social group. Based on Conze's eight similarities, Stephan A. Hoeller gives the following list of similarities:
 Liberation or salvation can be achieved by a liberating insight, namely gnosis or jnana
 Ignorance, or a lack of insight, called agnosis or avidyā, is the root cause of entrapment in this world
 Liberating insight can be achieved by interior revelation, not by external knowledge
 Both systems give a hierarchical ordering of spiritual attainment, from blind materialism to complete spiritual attainment
 Wisdom, as the feminine principle personified in Sophia and prajna, plays an important role in both religions
 Myth is preferred over historical fact; Christ and Buddha are not mere historical figures, but archetypal primordial beings
 Both systems have antinomian tendencies, that is, a disregard for rules and social conventions in higher spiritual attainment
 Both systems are intended for spiritual elites, not for the masses, and have hidden meanings and teachings
 Both systems are monistic, aiming at a metaphysical oneness beyond the multiplicity of the phenomenal world

Manichaeism

Influences from Buddhism 

Manichaeism was directly influenced by Buddhism. Like Buddha, Mani aimed for nirvana and used this word, showing the significance of Buddhist influences. He further believed in the transmigration of souls, sangha, and used various Buddhist terms in his teachings. Mircea Eliade noted similarities in the symbolism of light and mystic knowledge, predating Manichaeism, and possibly going back to an early common Indo-Iranian source. Mani considered himself to be a reincarnation of Buddha. He also claimed that he was preaching the same message of Buddha. Giovanni Verardi notes that Manichaeism is the prime source for comparisons between Buddhism and Gnosticism, Manichaeism representing "the same urban and mercantile ambience of which Buddhism was an expression in India." When the mercantile economy declined due to the decline of the Roman Empire, Manichaeism lost its support. The Manichaeans were hostile to the closed society of farming and landownership, just like the Buddhism conflicted with the "non-urban world controlled by Brahman laymen."

Mani, an Arsacid Persian by birth, was born 216 AD in Mesopotamia (modern Iraq), then within the Persian Sassanid Empire. According to the Cologne Mani-Codex, Mani's parents were members of the Jewish Christian Gnostic sect known as the Elcesaites.

Mani believed that the teachings of Buddha, Zoroaster, and Jesus were incomplete, and that his revelations were for the entire world, calling his teachings the "Religion of Light." Following Mani's travels to the Kushan Empire at the beginning of his proselytizing career, various Buddhist influences seem to have permeated Manichaeism:

According to Willis Barnstone and Marvin Meyer, evidence of the influence of Buddhist thought on the teachings of Mani can be found throughout texts related to Mani. In the story of the death of Mani, the Buddhist term nirvana is used:

Influences on Buddhism 

Following the introduction of Manichaeism to China, Manichaeans in China adopted a syncretic, sinified vocabulary borrowed primarily from Chinese Buddhism. Between 9th and 14th-centuries, following centuries of pressure to assimilate and persecution by successive Chinese dynasties, Chinese Manichaeans increasing involved themselves with the Pure Land school of Mahayana Buddhism in southern China, practicing together so closely alongside the Mahayana Buddhists that over the years Manichaeism came to be absorbed into the Pure Land school making the two traditions indistinguishable. Through this close interaction, Manichaeism had profound influence on Chinese Maitreyan Buddhist sects such as the White Lotus Sect.

Notes

References

Bibliography 

 
 
 
 
 
 
 
 
 
 
 
 
 
 

Gnosticism
Gnosticism and other religions
Buddhism and Christianity